The Aitchelitz First Nation, also known as the Aitchelitz Band, is a First Nations band government of the Sto:lo people, located at Sardis, British Columbia, Canada (Chilliwack).  It is a member of the Sto:lo Nation tribal council.

Reserves
The band has three Indian Reserves:
Aitchelitch 9, 21.4 ha., 2.25 miles southwest of downtown Chilliwack
Grass 15, 64.8 ha, 3.5 miles southeast of downtown Chilliwack
Skumalasph 16, 468.4 ha., 6 miles northwest of downtown Chilliwack

It also shares Pekw'Xe:yles (Peckquaylis) Reserve, the former St. Mary's Indian Residential School and associated lands in Mission, with 20 other Sto:lo band governments.

Treaty process
Aitchelitz First Nation is part of seven of the 11 Sto:lo Nation First Nations have decided to continue in the BC Treaty Process.  They have reached Stage 4.

Population
The band has a registered population of 40, 25 of whom live on one of the band's reserves.

References

Sto:lo governments
First Nations governments in the Lower Mainland